Robert Bridge (16 April 1883 – 17 July 1953) was a British racewalker. He competed in the 10 km walk at the 1912 Summer Olympics.

References

1883 births
1953 deaths
British male racewalkers
Olympic athletes of Great Britain
Athletes (track and field) at the 1912 Summer Olympics